Krishna Nagar is an elevated metro station located on the Red Line of Lucknow Metro in the city of Lucknow, Uttar Pradesh, India.

Krishna Nagar Metro Station is an important commuting hub for the residential areas of Krishna Nagar, LDA and Aashiyana. Krishna Nagar is on the west side of Kanpur Highway and LDA and Aashiyana are on the east side of Kanpur Highway. Krishna Nagar Metro Station has motorbike and car parking areas on both sides of the highway it is built over. It serves as a main mode of commute for the students studying in CMS, LDA branch as it is the fastest and safest point for children to commute.

History
Krishna Nagar Metro Station was built in 2017.

Structure

Station layout

Connections

The metro line connects Krishna Nagar to downtown, Alambagh, Alambagh Bus Station, Charbagh Railway Station, Hussain Ganj, Hazrat Ganj, IT College, Lucknow University, Indira Nagar, Badhshah Nagar, Mahanagar and Munshipuliya on the west and within a twenty-minute ride to the east, Transport Nagar, Amausi and CCS Airport.

Entry/Exit

See also

References

External links

 website

 UrbanRail.Net – descriptions of all metro systems in the world, each with a schematic map showing all stations.

Lucknow Metro stations
Railway stations in India opened in 2017